The Denmark national under-19 speedway team is the national under-19 motorcycle speedway team of Denmark and is controlled by the Danish Motor Union. The team started in Team U-19 European Championship in all editions and won two bronze medals. Denmark has produced two Under-19 European Champions: Kenneth Bjerre (2003), Nicolai Klindt (2007).

Competition

See also 
 Denmark national speedway team
 Denmark national under-21 speedway team

External links 
 (da) Speedway at Danish Motor Union webside

National speedway teams
Speedway
Team